The 1983 British Columbia general election was the 33rd provincial election for the province of British Columbia, Canada. It was held to elect members of the Legislative Assembly of British Columbia. The election was called on April 7, 1983. The election was held on May 5, 1983. The new legislature that resulted from this election met for the first time on June 23, 1983.

The governing Social Credit Party of British Columbia was re-elected with a majority government, defeating the opposition New Democratic Party of British Columbia. The "Socreds" increased both their share of the popular vote almost half of all votes) and their number of seats in the legislature. No other parties other than the Socreds and the NDP won seats in the legislature.

There were seven two-member constituencies in this election. Voters in these places were allowed two votes (block-voting), and generally used them both on the same party. None of these districts elected both a SC and a NDP MLA.  

All districts elected either two SC-ers (4 districts) or two NDP-ers (three districts), with no representation given to the minority vote in the district. This helped ensure the government's capture of the most seats. (It also makes the "popular vote," the votes cast, not truly reflective of the sentiment of the voters, due to some voters in these seven districts casting two votes and the voters in the other 43 districts casting only one.)

Results

Note:

* Party did not nominate candidates in the previous election.

See also
List of British Columbia political parties

References

Further reading
 

1983
British Columbia
General election
British Columbia general election